Elisa Johanne Rosa Maria Boglino (7 May 1905 – 2002) was a Danish-Italian painter, active in Denmark and Italy.

Biography

The father was Legationssekr. Alberto Maioli.

Boglino grew up with her divorced mother. Boglino married, and settled in Palermo in 1927.

According to a colleague from the years in Sicily Lia Pasqualina Noto (it) during the thirties it seems that Boglino had moved to Rome until her death.

Boglino studied from 1923 to 1926 at the Royal Danish Academy of Fine Arts under Sigurd Wandel<ref name="enciclopediadelledonne">Elisa Maria Boglino| enciclopedia delle donne Enciclopedia delle donne']</ref>

One painting was purchased by Modern Art Gallery Sant'Anna (Palermo).

Her husband was Giovanni Boglino (born 1898 in Palermo).

The family home during World War II was a vineyard in the mountains south of Cefalu on the northern cost of Sicily.

Exhibitions

 1926–27, 1929: Charlottenborg in Copenhagen
 1930: Venice Biennale (sala 34 and 37, catalogue p. 127 and 136)
 1930: Exhibitions at Mostre del Sindacato di Belle Arti [Syndicate of fine art] in Palermo, Catania and Florence
 1932: Third Exhibition of The Sicilian Fascist Syndicate(wins prize Podesta di Palermo)
 1932: Galleria di Roma (personal, curated by Pietro Maria Bardi)Artedonna p.177
 1932: Galleria del Milione, Milan (personalArtedonna p. 178
 1932: Wolfgang Gurlitt Galleri, Berlin(personal)
 1933-34: Venice Biennale (sala 48, cat. p. 190)
 1933: Fourth  Regional Exhibition of the  Art Syndicate in Catania
 1933: Gallery Christian Larsen in Copenhagen
 1949: Bach's Kunsthandel in  Copehagen and at Jugels Kunst in  Århus (Personal)
 1954: Gallery  "Vetrina of Chiurazzi " in Rome
 1954: IV Exhibition of Painting in May in Bari
 1956: VIII Exhibition og Painting  C.I.M (wins prize of Roberto Merli)
 1956: Venice Biennnale (sala 28, cat. p. 118)
 1958: Gallery del Vantaggio, Rome (Personal)
 1958: Premio di Pittura Valle Roveto (wins prize of Zahrtmann)
 1958: Biennale of holy art, Grosseto
 1959: Maggio Pittura Romana (Painting in May Rome)(wins  prize of  Rome)
 1960: Exhibition Augustinian of holy art, Rome
 1963: Gallery del Vantaggio, Roma (personal)

Grønningen, in  Copenhagen (invitated)
 1976: Exhibition of holy art, Viterbo
 1979: Gallery Hågen Muller, Copenhagen (personal)
 1996: Art  of Sicily  in the Thirties, Trenta and Marsala
 2001: The Church S. Maria in Montesanto, The Artists' Fair, Rome

Posthumous exhibitions:
 2002: "In the Shadow"-Female art from the eighteenth and nineteenth century".Nell'Ombra – L’arte al femminile tra Ottocento e Novecento. (Gallery of modern art in Palermo – GAM)
 2003-2004 (Minsk, Mosca, Barcellona, Palermo): Novecento Siciliano."Sicilian nineteenth"
 2006:"The Wounds of being" . Solitude and meditation among Sicilian women in the thirties. Le ferite dell’essere: Solitudine e meditazione nelle siciliane degli anni ‘30, a cura di Anna Maria Ruta, Spazi Espositivi Chiaramontani, Agrigento.
 2007: "Female avant-gardes in Italy and Russia", Avantguardie femminili in Italia e Russia, a cura di Renato Miracco, Galleria Regionale Pallazzo Bellomo, Palermo.
 2012: "Womenart",100 years of female art in Sicily 1850-1950", Artedonna, Cento anni d’arte femminile in Sicilia 1850–1950,"Artedonna" in mostra all’Albergo delle Povere. balarm.it. a cura di Anna Maria Ruta, presso il Reale Albergo delle Povere, Palermo.
 2014:"Sicilian Artists, from Pirandello to Judice", Artisti di Sicilia, da Pirandello a Judice, a cura di Vittorio Sgarbi, presso l’ex Stabilimento Florio, Favignana, Catania.
 2016-2017: "Topazia Alliata. A life in the sign of art", Topazia Alliata. Una vita nel segno dell’Arte, a cura di Anna Maria Ruta, presso Palazzo S. Elia, Palermo.
 2020-2021:"Sicilian Artists", Artisti di Sicilia, a cura di Vittorio Sgarbi, presso Convitto delle Arti, Noto.

Works
 "Donna e bimbo" / "Madre e Figlia"](Woman and Child) - [permanent collection] at Modern Art Gallery Sant'Anna (in Palermo).
 "Figures" and "Horses" Civic Gallery of Modern and Contemporary Art, Monreale, Sicily
 "Donne col Parapioggia": Museo valle Roveto Civita d'Antino
 "Le Alienate"( The Obsessed) At The Museo Mart, Museo di arte moderna e contemporanea di Trento e Rovereto
 "Donna Seduta" (Seated Woman") Collezione Antonio Pusateri, Agrigent
 "Emmaus" Basilica Santa Maria in Leuca
"The good Samaritan", "Selfpotrait 1930", "Jesus heals the obsessed" and "Matilde"  and 6 drawings

Gallery

References

Further reading
 
 
 Boglino 62 reproductions e note de P. M. Bardi (1932). Firenze.
 
 Sergio Troisi (a cura di), Arte in Sicilia negli anni Trenta, cit. pp. 67–68. (1996)
 Rosa Mastrandrea (a cura di), Nell'ombra. L'arte al femmminile tra Ottocento e Novecento, cit. p. 73. (2002)
 Maria Antonietta Spadaro (a cura di), Novecento Siciliano, Catalogo delle mostra, Minsk, 22 ottobre-30 novembre, Mosca, 10 dicembre-30 gennaio; Barcellona, 20 febbraio-10 aprile 2004; Palermo, 25 maggio-10 luglio. Cigno Edizioni, Roma. (2003/2004)
 Anna Maria Ruta (a cura di), Le ferite dell'essere. Solitudine e meditazione nell'arte Siciliana negli anni Trenta, cit. p. 59. (2005)
 
 "Mutter" Ein buch der Liebe und des Dankes, Gutenberg, Berlin, Wien, Pragh, Zurich, 1933. Illustrated among others by: Kaethe Kollwitz, Oscar Kokoschka, Hanna Nagel and Elisa Maria Boglino.
 " Elisa M. Boglino A journey of art between Copenhagen, Palermo and Rome". Anna Maria Ruta, (2021), book 120p. ISBN  9791280198099 

External links
 
 Ruta, Anna Maria (ed.): Artedonna: Cento anni di arte femminile in Sicilia 1850-1950. Palermo 2012. , pp. 163–182. (details)</ref>
 Elisa Maria Boglino at Enciclopediadelledonne.it 
 "Donna e bimbo" / "Madre e Figlia" at Galleria d'arte moderna Sant'Anna'', 'GAM Palermo', Gampalermo.it ("Arte al femminile": uno speciale percorso sensoriale nel mese della prevenzione del tumore al seno --- "Female art": a special sensorial journey in the month of breast cancer prevention) 
 Elisa Maria Boglino:  at Donna e bimbo at Gampalermo.it (Mediateca, Collezioni secondo piano)
  Novecento, da Pirandello a Guccione: Noto racconta un secolo di Sicilia.
 The Italian 20th Century
https://fabulaviva.it/2021/07/01/maria-elisa-boglino-un-percorso-darte-tra-copenaghen-palermo-e-roma/

1905 births
2002 deaths
Danish women painters
20th-century Danish painters
20th-century Danish women artists
20th-century Danish artists
Italian women painters
20th-century Italian painters
20th-century Italian women artists
Artists from Copenhagen
Danish emigrants to Italy